FC Kelechek Osh is a Kyrgyzstani football club based in Osh that plays in the top division  the Kyrgyzstan League.

History

Achievements 
Kyrgyzstan League:
6th place, group B: 2003

Kyrgyzstan Cup:

Current squad

External links 
Career stats by KLISF

Football clubs in Kyrgyzstan